The individual dressage in equestrian at the 1932 Olympic Games in Los Angeles was held at the Riviera Country Club in Pacific Palisades on 10 August. France's Xavier Lesage won the gold medal and his countrymen Charles Marion the silver. The bronze was won by Hiram Tuttle of the United States.

Competition format

The team and individual dressage competitions used the same results. Competition consisted of a single phase, with the final standings decided by ordinals. Ties were broken using total points.

Results

 Sandström was placed last by the Jury for violation of a rule of the FEI.

References

Individual dressage